Huntington Avenue is a thoroughfare in the city of Boston, Massachusetts, beginning at Copley Square, and continuing west through the Back Bay, Fenway, Longwood, and Mission Hill neighborhoods. Huntington Avenue is signed as Route 9 (formerly Route C9). A section of Huntington Avenue has been officially designated the Avenue of the Arts by the city of Boston.

Description
In the Back Bay neighborhood, the avenue is primarily dominated by the Mother Church and headquarters of the Church of Christ, Scientist and the buildings of the Prudential Center shopping and office complex.

The middle portion of Huntington Avenue designated the "Avenue of the Arts" is lined by many significant artistic venues and educational institutions in Boston, including Symphony Hall, Horticultural Hall, the New England Conservatory, Northeastern University, the Huntington Avenue Theatre (Huntington Theatre Company's mainstage), the Museum of Fine Arts, Wentworth Institute of Technology, and the Massachusetts College of Art. The Isabella Stewart Gardner Museum is also only about a block from Huntington Avenue.

Near the Longwood Medical Area, the street touches upon a number of medical research institutions and hospital complexes, including the Harvard Medical School, Harvard T.H. Chan School of Public Health, and Massachusetts College of Pharmacy and Health Sciences.

At the point at which the street reaches the overpass of the Jamaicaway and the border of the town of Brookline, South Huntington Avenue runs south towards Jamaica Plain Center, while Route 9 continues west into Brookline as Boylston Street.

Public transportation
The E branch of the MBTA Green Line roughly follows Huntington Avenue underground from Copley Square until it rises above ground at the Northeastern portal. It then operates in a dedicated median of Huntington Avenue between Northeastern University and the Brigham Circle stop, where trains begin street running in mixed  traffic to a terminus at Heath Street.

The MBTA #39 bus runs from Back Bay station via Huntington Avenue following the streetcar line, and traveling beyond Heath Street to Forest Hills station. The bus route is considered one of the key bus routes in the system, with high ridership and enhanced levels of service.

History

Huntington Avenue began in Art Square (now Copley Square) and wended its way toward Brookline. By 1883, the square that had been named for the adjacent (and later relocated) Museum of Fine Arts was renamed Copley Square. The avenue originally began at the intersection of Clarendon and Boylston Streets, and ran diagonally across the square past Trinity Church. In the 1960s this stretch was eliminated as part of a redesign of the square, and now the avenue originates from the intersection of Dartmouth Street and St. James Avenue.

The street had originally been called Western Avenue, and was later renamed after Ralph Huntington (1784–1866). Huntington was one of the men who moved to have the Back Bay filled in. He donated money to many of the institutions in the Back Bay, and later the Fenway.

An existing system of horse-drawn streetcar lines was extended onto Huntington Avenue around 1883, running in a dedicated median from Francis Street to the Boston Public Library. From there it ran in general street traffic until turning onto Boylston Street. In 1894, the streetcar line was electrified. On February 16, 1941, the Tremont Street Subway (which in 1914 had already been extended for other lines running through Copley Square) opened a streetcar portal on Huntington Ave near Northeastern University. This allowed streetcars to avoid surface traffic from Copley to Northeastern, and created two new subway stops: Symphony and Mechanics (now Prudential).

Huntington Avenue, near Northeastern University, was the site of the old Boston Red Sox stadium and site of the first World Series game in 1903.  A statue of Cy Young stands on the current day Northeastern campus to commemorate the location of the pitcher's mound of the Huntington Avenue Grounds ballpark.

Gallery

See also

 Boston YMCA
 Brigham Circle
 Copley Square
 First Church of Christ, Scientist
 Harvard School of Public Health
 Horticultural Hall, Boston, Massachusetts
 Huntington Theatre Company
 Jordan Hall
 Longwood Medical and Academic Area
 Massachusetts College of Art and Design
 MCPHS University
 Museum of Fine Arts, Boston
 New England Conservatory
 Northeastern University
 Wentworth Institute of Technology

Demolished buildings

 Chickering Hall, Boston
 Original buildings of the Massachusetts Institute of Technology were located at the Copley Square origin of Huntington Avenue
 Mechanics' Hall (1881–1959) built by Massachusetts Charitable Mechanic Association
 Original building of the Museum of Fine Arts was located in Copley Square
 New England Manufacturers' and Mechanics' Institute (1880s)
 St. James Theatre, Boston

References

External links

 City of Boston Archives. Electric street lights on Huntington Avenue, c. 1910

Streets in Boston
Northeastern University